The 1997–98 Virginia Cavaliers men's basketball team represented the University of Virginia during the 1997–98 NCAA Division I men's basketball season. The team was led by eighth-year head coach Jeff Jones, and played their home games at University Hall in Charlottesville, Virginia as members of the Atlantic Coast Conference. At the end of the season, Jones resigned as head coach; he would be replaced by Providence Friars head coach Pete Gillen.

Last season
The Cavaliers had a record of 18–13, with a conference record of 7–9. They reached the first round of the 1997 NCAA Men's Division I Basketball Tournament as a #9 seed, where they lost to #8 seed Iowa.

Roster

Schedule 

|-
!colspan=9 style="background:#00214e; color:#f56d22;"| Exhibition game

|-
!colspan=9 style="background:#00214e; color:#f56d22;"| Regular season

|-
!colspan=9 style="background:#00214e; color:#f56d22;"| ACC Tournament

References

Virginia Cavaliers men's basketball seasons
Virginia
Virginia Cavaliers men's basketball
1998 in sports in Virginia